The following is a list of pilots and other aircrew who flew during the Battle of Britain, and were awarded the Battle of Britain Clasp to the 1939–45 Star by flying at least one authorised operational sortie with an eligible unit of the Royal Air Force or Fleet Air Arm during the period from 0001 hours on 10 July to 2359 hours 31 October 1940.

History
In 1942, the Air Ministry made the decision to compile a list from records of the names of pilots who had lost their lives as a result of the fighting during the Battle of Britain for the purpose of building a national memorial. This became the Battle of Britain Chapel at Westminster Abbey, which was unveiled by King George VI on 10 July 1947. The Roll of Honour within the Chapel contains the names of 1,497 pilots and aircrew killed or mortally wounded during the Battle.

Nothing was done officially, however, to define the qualifications for the classification of a Battle of Britain airman until 9 November 1960. AMO N850, published by the Air Ministry, stated for the first time the requirements for the awarding of the Battle of Britain Star, and listed the 71 units which were deemed to have been under the control of RAF Fighter Command.

In 1955 Flt Lt John Holloway, a serving RAF officer, began a personal challenge to compile a complete list of "The Few". After fourteen years of research Flt Lt Holloway had 2,946 names on the list. Of these airmen, 537 were killed during the Battle or later died of wounds received.

The Battle of Britain Memorial Trust, founded by Geoffrey Page, raised funds for the construction of the Battle of Britain Memorial at Capel-le-Ferne near Folkestone in Kent. The Memorial, unveiled by Queen Elizabeth The Queen Mother on 9 July 1993, shares the site with the Christopher Foxley-Norris Memorial Wall on which a complete list of "The Few" is engraved.

More recently, the Battle of Britain Monument on the Victoria Embankment in London was unveiled on 18 September 2005 by Charles, Prince of Wales and his wife Camilla, Duchess of Cornwall. The idea for the monument was conceived by the Battle of Britain Historical Society which then set about raising funds for its construction. The outside of the monument is lined with bronze plaques listing all the Allied airmen who took part in the Battle.

L

M

N

Notes on table
Ranks given are those held during the Battle of Britain, although a higher rank may have been achieved after the Battle.
All individuals listed in bold and highlighted in silver are believed to be still alive.
Aircrew listed as KIA, MIA, WIA or KIFA during the Battle of Britain are highlighted in blue.
The awards listed include those made during the Battle of Britain and during the remainder of World War II, as well as any made post-war.
In order to limit the numbers of footnotes which would otherwise be required, the symbol ‡ under "Notes" indicates several entries in the text of Ramsay 1989, while the symbol † indicates that information on the circumstances under which an airman became a casualty during the Battle is included in the text of the book. Where more than one crew member of a multi place aircraft was involved this is included as a cross-reference under "Notes"
In addition to 2,353 British aircrew, the RAF Roll of Honour recognises 574 personnel from other countries; namely:
Australia, Barbados, Belgium, Canada, Czechoslovakia, France, Ireland, Jamaica, Newfoundland, New Zealand, Poland, Rhodesia, South Africa and the United States.

Abbreviations
(CO) after "Sqn" denotes Commanding Officer of that squadron, as per the RAF Fighter Command Order of Battle on 15 September 1940, unless otherwise indicated.
(FAA) after a rank denotes a member of the Fleet Air Arm rather than the RAF.
"KIA" – "killed in action"
"KIFA" – "killed in flying accident", i.e. not during combat
"MIA" – "missing in action".
"WIA" –  "wounded in action" leading to death which, in some cases, may have occurred months later.
"POW" – "prisoner of war".
For details of RAF rank abbreviations, see RAF Commissioned Officer Ranks and RAF Non-Commissioned Officer Ranks.
For details of FAA rank abbreviations, see FAA Commissioned Officer Ranks.

Nationalities

Awards

See also
Non-British personnel in the RAF during the Battle of Britain
List of World War II aces from the United Kingdom
List of World War II flying aces by country
List of World War II flying aces
List of RAF aircrew in the Battle of Britain (A–C)
List of RAF aircrew in the Battle of Britain (D–F)
List of RAF aircrew in the Battle of Britain (G–K)
List of RAF aircrew in the Battle of Britain (O–R)
List of RAF aircrew in the Battle of Britain (S–U)
List of RAF aircrew in the Battle of Britain (V–Z)

Notes
Notes

Citations

Bibliography

Ramsay, Winston, ed. The Battle of Britain Then and Now Mk V. London: Battle of Britain Prints International Ltd, 1989. .
Ringlstetter, Herbert (2005). Helmut Wick, An Illustrated Biography Of The Luftwaffe Ace And Commander Of Jagdgeschwader 2 During The Battle Of Britain. Atglen, PA: Schiffer Publishing. .
Remembering the Battle of Britain
Robert Dixon, '607 Squadron: A Shade Of Blue'. The History Press 2008. 
Robert Dixon, 'A Gathering Of Eagles' PublishBritannica 2004, 

RAF aircrew